Dan O'Brien is an American journalist, author and screenwriter with an emphasis in sports, having written books, television sports stories, magazine articles and a screenplay.

O’Brien collaborated with former NFL star and current ESPN College Football analyst Mark May on Mark May’s Tales from the Washington Redskins (with) Dan O’Brien. He co-authored MizzouRah! Memorable Moments in Missouri Tiger Football History, with popular Los Angeles sportscaster Todd Donoho.

A graduate of the University of Missouri’s School of Broadcast Journalism, O’Brien is a former television anchor, reporter and producer, including stints with network affiliates in Columbia, Missouri; Montgomery, Alabama; Grand Rapids, Michigan; Miami, Florida, Washington D.C., Pittsburgh, Pennsylvania and Indianapolis, Indiana.

His documentaries and special programming earned numerous broadcasting honors, including an Emmy Award for his series on women’s athletics at the University of Miami.  Speed, Crash, Rescue, a documentary written and produced by O’Brien about safety issues in the Indy Car Racing League, received worldwide distribution.

O’Brien was a script consultant for two films by director Ryan Little; Outlaw Trail: The Treasure of Butch Cassidy and Forever Strong.

He has written a screenplay based on the life of Hall of Famer George (Rube) Waddell titled Rube. Rube was a third place finisher in the "Free Screenplay Contest", which received nearly 2,000 entries worldwide. Rube was also a quarterfinalist in the "Bluecat Screenplay Contest."

A former committee member with the Society of American Baseball Research (SABR), O’Brien has written biographies of Rube Waddell and Osee Schrecongost for Deadball Stars of the American League, published by SABR.

He is a founding member of board of directors for the Pittsburgh Pandas of the Tri-State Summer Collegiate Baseball League.

References 

Collier, Gene. "Before the Babe, There was Prospect's Zany Rube", Pittsburgh Post-Gazette
Cavin, Curt. "Old Pitcher Throws Local Man a Curve, The Indianapolis Star
Jones, Annette. "Chasing ‘THE RUBE’", The Daily Journal, Greenwood, IN

American sports journalists
Living people
Place of birth missing (living people)
Year of birth missing (living people)